Wright, also known as Wrights Cross Roads, is an unincorporated community in Lauderdale County, in the U.S. state of Alabama.

History
Wright was named for Moses Wright, a post rider on the Natchez Trace, who settled in the area and operated a general store. In 1900, Wright was home to three stores, a mill, and cotton gin, and was a center of cross tie production. A post office was in operation under the name Wright from 1891 to 1914.

References

Unincorporated communities in Lauderdale County, Alabama
Unincorporated communities in Alabama